Buddy Jewell is the third studio album by the American country music singer of the same name. The album was Jewell's major-label debut and his first album since winning season one of Nashville Star. As part of the Nashville Star prize, the album was produced by Clint Black and recorded entirely in ten days.

Buddy Jewell was released on July 1, 2003 by Columbia Records. It debuted at #1 on Billboard'''s Top Country Albums chart with sales of 51,765 copies, the third highest first week sales of a debut album since the inception of Nielsen SoundScan in 1991. The album has since been certified Gold by the RIAA for sales of 500,000 copies.

The first two singles released from the album, "Help Pour Out the Rain (Lacey's Song)" and "Sweet Southern Comfort," both reached the Top 5 of Billboard's Hot Country Songs chart in 2003. A third single, "One Step at a Time," reached the Top 40 the following year. Also included is "Today I Started Loving You Again," a duet with fellow Nashville Star contestant Miranda Lambert on a song co-written and previously recorded by Merle Haggard. "Abilene on Her Mind" and "One in a Row" were previously included on Jewell's 2001 independent release, One in a Row''.

Track listing

Personnel
Adapted from liner notes.

 Eddie Bayers - drums
 Clint Black - bass harmonica (tracks 3, 7), harmonica (track 2, 9, 11), background vocals (track 3)
 Dane Bryant - synthesizer (track 8)
 Mark Casstevens - banjo (track 3)
 Lisa Cochran - background vocals
 Stuart Duncan - fiddle, mandolin
 Larry Franklin - fiddle (track 2)
 Paul Franklin - dobro, steel guitar
 James Garner - harmonica (track 3)
 Wes Hightower - background vocals (track 2)
 Buddy Jewell - lead vocals
 Miranda Lambert - duet vocals (track 4)
 Brent Mason - electric guitar
 Larry Paxton - bass guitar (track 2)
 Matt Rollings - piano
 John Wesley Ryles - background vocals
 Biff Watson - acoustic guitar, classical guitar
 Glenn Worf - bass guitar

Charts

Weekly charts

Year-end charts

References 

2003 albums
Buddy Jewell albums
Columbia Records albums
Albums produced by Clint Black